2 O'Clock Date is an upcoming South Korean romantic comedy film directed by Lee Sang-geun, starring Im Yoon-ah and Ahn Bo-hyun. It tells the story of a woman from downstairs having an unimaginable secret, meeting the man from upstairs at 2 a.m., and having an extraordinary date, when everyone else in the building is asleep.

Cast 
 Im Yoon-ah as Jeong Seon-ji, a woman living in the downstairs house who is lovely but has a secret reversal beyond imagination.
 Ahn Bo-hyun as Gil-goo, a white-haired man living in the upstairs house, who spends time with Seon-ji every morning.
 Sung Dong-il as Jeong-Soo, father of Jeong Seon-ji.
 Joo Hyun-young as Jeong Ara, cousin of Jeong Seon-ji.
 Go Geon-han as Hee-beom, a friend of Gil-goo.

Production

Casting 
Initially, in September 2021, Im Yoon-ah and Kim Seon-ho were confirmed for the leading roles in the movie. In 
October 2021, Kim Seon-ho withdrew from the project. In December 2021, it was reported that Ahn Bo-hyun would star in the movie, replacing Kim Seon-ho.

Filming 
Principal photography began on April 28, 2022.

References

External links
 
 

Upcoming films
2020s South Korean films
2020s Korean-language films
South Korean romantic comedy films